Clea funesta is a species of freshwater snail with an operculum, an aquatic gastropod mollusk in the family Buccinidae, the true whelks, most of which are marine.

References

External links 

Buccinidae
Gastropods described in 1862